Carlota Lozano (born September 7, 1945 in Colón, Panama) is a Panamanian trainer and former beauty queen.

Miss Panama
She was elected Miss World Panama, the first Miss Panama for this pageant.

Miss World
She grew up in Colón, Panama and became the official representative of Panama to the 1967 Miss World pageant held in London, United Kingdom on November 16, 1967.

References

External links
Miss Panamá blogspot
Miss World Official Website

1945 births
Living people
Panamanian beauty pageant winners
Miss World 1967 delegates